In enzymology, a desacetoxyvindoline 4-hydroxylase is an enzyme that catalyzes the chemical reaction

desacetoxyvindoline + 2-oxoglutarate + O2  deacetylvindoline + succinate + CO2

The 3 substrates of this enzyme are desacetoxyvindoline, 2-oxoglutarate, and O2, whereas its 3 products are deacetylvindoline, succinate, and CO2.

This enzyme belongs to the family of oxidoreductases, specifically those acting on paired donors, with O2 as oxidant and incorporation or reduction of oxygen. The oxygen incorporated need not be derived from O2 with 2-oxoglutarate as one donor, and incorporation of one atom o oxygen into each donor.  The systematic name of this enzyme class is desacetoxyvindoline,2-oxoglutarate:oxygen oxidoreductase (4beta-hydroxylating). Other names in common use include desacetoxyvindoline 4-hydroxylase, desacetyoxyvindoline-17-hydroxylase, D17H, desacetoxyvindoline,2-oxoglutarate:oxygen oxidoreductase, and (4beta-hydroxylating).  This enzyme participates in terpene indole and ipecac alkaloid biosynthesis.

References

 
 
 

EC 1.14.11
Enzymes of unknown structure